Bibionellus is a genus of March flies (Bibionidae).

Species
B. aczeli Hardy, 1953
B. barrettoi Lane & Forattini, 1948
B. halteralis (Coquillett, 1904)
B. paulistensis Lane & Forattini, 1948
B. tibialis Edwards, 1935

References

Bibionidae
Nematocera genera